The Middle English surname Spicer  is derived from the Old French word especier, which in turn was derived from the Latin speciarius. Translated, it refers to a seller of spices, a grocer or a druggist. It is also a variation of the Jewish name Spitzer.

People with the surname Spicer include:

 Andi Spicer (born 1959), British composer
 André Spicer, New Zealand professor of organisational behaviour
 Bob Spicer (1925-2016), American baseball player
 Bryan Spicer, television director, 24
 Clarence W. Spicer, inventor of the Universal joint (Spicer joint)
 Dave Spicer (born 1985), Canadian rugby player
 David Spicer (disambiguation), several people
 Dorothy Gladys Spicer (1893–1975), American writer
 Dorothy Spicer, English aviator
 Eddie Spicer (1922–2004), English football player
 Ella Spicer (1876–1958), New Zealand painter
 Frederick Spicer (1820–1905), medical doctor and, briefly, politician in South Australia
 Geoffrey Spicer-Simson (1876–1947), a Royal Navy officer
 Grace Spicer (born 1992), English kickboxer 
 Harriet Spicer (born 1950), lay member of the Judicial Appointments Commission in England and Wales
 Ishmail Spicer (1760–1832), American composer
 Jack Spicer (disambiguation), several people
 James Spicer (1925–2015), British Conservative
 Jimmy Spicer, rap artist
 John Spicer (disambiguation), several people
 Keith Spicer (born 1934), Canadian Commissioner of Official Languages
 Kimberly Spicer (born 1980), American actress
 Lancelot Dykes Spicer (1893–1979), British Liberal Party politician
 Lorne Spicer (born 1965), British television presenter
 Michael Spicer (1943–2019), British politician
 Nellie Spicer (born 1987), American volleyball player
 Paul Spicer (born 1975), American football player
 Peggy Spicer (1908–1984), New Zealand artist
 Raymond A. Spicer, director of the White House Military Office
 Sean Spicer (born 1971), political strategist and White House Press Secretary and Communications Director
 Simeon Spicer (died 1908), American politician
 Sir Albert Spicer, 1st Baronet (1847–1934), English businessman and Liberal politician
 Sir Howard Handley Spicer (1872–1926), papermaker, wholesale stationer and magazine editor, founder of the Empire League
 Tim Spicer (born 1952), Lieutenant-Colonel in the Scots Guards
 Tracey Spicer, Australian journalist
 Wells Spicer, American lawyer
 William Ambrose Spicer (1865–1952), Seventh-day Adventist minister
 William L. Spicer (1918-1991), American politician
 William Spicer (Medal of Honor), American Medal of Honor recipient
 William Webb Spicer (1820–1879), English botanist and Anglican rector

References
 Surname DB
 Ancestry.com
 The Spicer's (sic) Genealogy
 House of Names

English-language surnames
Occupational surnames
English-language occupational surnames